USS Kidd may refer to:

 , a Fletcher-class destroyer, serving from 1943 to 1964
 , the first ship of the Kidd class of destroyers, serving from 1981 to 1998
 , an Arleigh Burke-class destroyer commissioned in 2007 and currently in service

United States Navy ship names